The Loyd Jowers Trial (officially the King family vs. Loyd Jowers and other unknown co-conspirators) was an American civil suit brought by the family of Martin Luther King Jr. against Loyd Jowers, following his claims of a conspiracy in the assassination of the civil rights leader in 1968. The jury would eventually decide in 1999 that there was a conspiracy perpetrated by Jowers and other conspirators.

Background
In 1993, Loyd Jowers appeared on the ABC News program PrimeTime Live. He claimed that he was paid $100,000 by alleged Memphis mobster Frank Liberto to help organize the assassination of Martin Luther King Jr. in 1968. Jowers owned a Memphis coffee shop directly neighboring the rooming house from which King was allegedly shot by James Earl Ray. Jowers had remained silent for twenty-five years after King's assassination. After watching Ray's HBO mock trial on TV, Jowers produced his confession and claimed that he was part of a larger conspiracy to assassinate King and frame Ray as a patsy. He also claimed that "Raoul," Memphis Police officers, and the Mafia had been involved. Jowers named Memphis Police Lieutenant Earl Clark as the shooter.

Trial and decision

In 1999, a civil suit alleged that Jowers and others had conspired to assassinate King. The King family turned to William Pepper, who had defended Ray in his HBO mock trial, to represent them in the wrongful death lawsuit, King family vs. Loyd Jowers and other unknown co-conspirators. During the four-week trial, Pepper brought forward over 70 witnesses and thousands of documents.

The jury that heard the case took only one hour of deliberations to reach a unanimous verdict: that King was assassinated as a result of a conspiracy. They found Jowers responsible, and also found that "governmental agencies" were among the conspirators. The King family was granted the $100 they requested in damages, and they saw it as vindication. King's son, Dexter, said: "This is the period at the end of the sentence. So please, after today, we don't want questions like, 'Do you believe James Earl Ray killed your father?' I've been hearing that all my life. No, I don't, and this is the end of it." Dexter further emphasized that "the shooter was the Memphis Police Department Officer, Lt. Earl Clark." 

Coretta Scott King said after the verdict: "There is abundant evidence of a major, high-level conspiracy in the assassination of my husband." The jury found that the mafia and various government agencies "were deeply involved in the assassination. ... Mr. Ray was set up to take the blame."

Result and criticism
The decision caused the Department of Justice to reopen the case. In 2000, Attorney General Janet Reno announced that, after looking into the assassination, no evidence of a conspiracy could be found. The Department of Justice found numerous inconsistencies in Jowers' statements. It also concluded there was no proof Frank Liberto belonged to the mafia and that, in its opinion, the witnesses that supported Jowers were not credible or contradictory. Furthermore, it expressed the belief that Jowers fabricated his story for financial reward.

Gerald Posner, an investigative journalist who wrote the book Killing the Dream in which he makes the case that Ray was the killer, said after the verdict: "It distresses me greatly that the legal system was used in such a callous and farcical manner in Memphis. If the King family wanted a rubber stamp of their own view of the facts, they got it." Robert Blakey also criticized Pepper's theories on the case.

See also

Martin Luther King Jr. assassination conspiracy theories

References

Assassination of Martin Luther King Jr.